The Port of Felixstowe Police is a non-Home Office ports police force established in 1975, responsible for policing the Port of Felixstowe in Felixstowe, Suffolk, United Kingdom.

Jurisdiction
Officers of this force are sworn in as special constables under section 79 of the Harbours, Docks, and Piers Clauses Act 1847, as incorporated by section 3(1)(e) of the Felixstowe Dock and Railway Act 1956. As a result, officers have the full powers of a constable on any land owned by the Port of Felixstowe and at any place within one mile of any owned land. The Port Police operate their own small fleet of liveried police cars and vans. Additional security is provided by MITIE.

Establishment
The force is commanded by the Chief Police Officer (currently J I Whitby), and is additionally made up of one inspector, four sergeants and 18 constables. Two controllers and one secretary support the force.

Constables work in one of four watches, designated 'A Watch', 'B Watch', 'C Watch', and 'D Watch', each supervised by a sergeant. For operational reasons, each watch requires a deputy supervisor, for which purpose four constables (one per watch) are afforded the rank of acting sergeant. As this is not a substantive rank, they are referenced as constables in policing statistics. The four watches report to the inspector, who as operations officer also supervises the control room and its two controllers.

The 24 sworn police officers are assisted by three administrative staff and 64 contract security guards, who carry out routine gate control and search duties.

Station sergeant
The rank of station sergeant was once common in British police forces, but was phased out of most forces between 1973 and 1989. After 1989 the Port of Felixstowe Police held the distinction of being the only British police force to retain this historic rank. A single station sergeant functioned as a deputy to the inspector. In 2015, on the retirement of Inspector M Hayward, the last station sergeant (Station Sergeant A Miaoulis) was promoted to inspector, and the rank of station sergeant was abolished.

Rank table
The following table illustrates the ranks used in the force.

Operations
The Port of Felixstowe Police has self-defined its operational responsibilities under eight headings:

 Security at the port
 Police protection to persons and property (including cargo)
 Facilitating lawful free movement
 Enforcing ISPS security code
 Police assistance at incidents, accidents, and emergencies
 Traffic management for the port complex (and outside the port, in conjunction with Suffolk Constabulary)
 Escorting abnormal or specialist loads
 Crime prevention, and crime reduction advice

The local Home Office police force, Suffolk Constabulary, are responsible for dealing with serious crime incidents within the port.

See also
Law enforcement in the United Kingdom
List of law enforcement agencies in the United Kingdom

References

External links
"Port Protection" section on the official website of the Port of Felixstowe

Police forces of England
Port police forces of the United Kingdom
Felixstowe